Suzanne Bofia (born November 9, 1984 in Bafia, Cameroon) is a Cameroonian collegiate basketball player, formerly a member the University of Arizona. She is the younger twin sister of former Wildcats teammate Beatrice Bofia.

Career
In the 2006-07 season, Bofia averaged 4.4 points and 3.4 rebounds per game in her first season at Arizona after transferring from Illinois Central College.

References

1984 births
Living people
Arizona Wildcats women's basketball players
Cameroonian expatriate basketball people in the United States
Cameroonian women's basketball players
Centers (basketball)
Cameroonian twins
Twin sportspeople
Illinois Central Cougars women's basketball players